Edible Baja Arizona was a magazine that published stories about the intersection of food and culture in Tucson and the Arizona/Sonora borderlands region. The magazine was published on a bi-monthly basis and was founded in 2013 by Tucson Weekly co-founder Douglas Biggers, its editor and publisher.

The magazine suspended publication in December 2017 after publishing 27 issues. The magazine earned more than three dozen awards for editorial and design excellence.

References

External links
 https://issuu.com/edibleba

Cultural magazines published in the United States
Bimonthly magazines published in the United States
Food and drink magazines
Local interest magazines published in the United States
Magazines established in 2013
Magazines published in Arizona
Mass media in Tucson, Arizona